Susan Kleckner was a feminist filmmaker, photographer, performance artist, and writer active from the late 1960s until 2010 and based in New York City.

Early life 
Kleckner was born in New York City on July 5, 1941, as one of four children of Anita and Charles Kleckner. When her father died in 1955 and her mother was hospitalized in 1956, she left home and supported herself by working in stores and restaurants. She began suffering from bipolar disorder in her teenage years. In her early twenties, she took up photography seriously. Despite her limited formal education, she worked as a counselor for people with intellectual disabilities in the mid-1960s.

Early activism and filmmaking 
Kleckner joined her first feminist consciousness raising group in the late 1960s. In 1969, she sought funding for Women Artists in Revolution (WAR) from the New York State Council on the Arts, working with both WAR and Feminists in the Arts and eventually receiving $5,000 from the council. She became the first woman to teach photography at the Pratt Institute in 1969, and helped found the Women's Interart Center in 1970.

She directed several films during this period. In 1970, she co-directed the 16 mm film Three Lives, often considered the first documentary about women produced by an all-woman crew, narrating three women's stories of coming out. Included in this film was footage of the Christopher Street Gay Liberation March, an early event in the LGBT rights movement of which very little known footage exists.

Her next documentary, in 1972, was Another Look at the Miami Convention: A Work In Progress, centered on the presidential candidacy of Shirley Chisholm, the first woman and African American to seek a presidential nomination. It featured the voices of feminists Betty Friedan, Gloria Steinem and Bella Abzug.

Birth Film, a short documentary self-directed by Kleckner, premiered at the Whitney Museum in 1973. The film depicted a woman, Kirstin Booth Glen, giving birth to her son at home, and was a statement on reproductive rights. Reviewers described feeling sick due to Birth Film's graphic nature, prompting Kleckner to take a break from filmmaking.

Later filmmaking and teaching 
Kleckner's other films upon her return included Bag Lady (1979), Pierre Film (1980), Amazing Grace (1980), Desert Piece (1983), and Performance for Cameras (1984).

She taught at the International Center of Photography from 1982, teaching courses such as "New York at Night", "Visual Diary", and "Roll-a-Day". She led workshops at the Pratt Institute, New York University and the University of Massachusetts Amherst.

Greenham Common and Windowpeace 

Kleckner visited Greenham Common Women's Peace Camp three separate times from 1984 to 1987, and topographed and videotaped the situation, and later edited her footage from Greenham Common into The Greenham Tapes. Some of the photos displayed the anarchist ideology of the peace camp as well as its collectivist method of decision-making.

Returning to New York City, she initiated Windowpeace, a one-year performance on West Broadway involving 41 women artists which ran from December 1986 to January 1987. The women individually spent 7 days in voluntary incarceration within a 5 by 6.5-foot display area behind bulletproof glass. The space had a loft bed, portable toilet, television monitor, video tape player, telephone, hot plate, and a curtain for occasional privacy. Petitions to promote peace and other activities were organised outside the glass. The project was highly acclaimed and won the Susan B. Anthony Award from the National Organization for Women' New York chapter in 1988, which honored grass-roots activists.

Berlin Wall performance and mental health 
A month after Windowpeace closed, in February 1987, Kleckner performed a non-violent art action by climbing the Berlin Wall with a ladder near Checkpoint Charlie. The East German authorities arrested and interrogated her for 20 hours before releasing her with the film she had recorded.

In February 1988, Kleckner suffered from a mental health breakdown due to her bipolar disorder, and spent time in a locked mental health ward. During this time, she photographed her experiences, and was awarded for these photographs in 1997 by the New York Foundation for the Arts Catalogue Project Grant for women photographers over 40 years old.

In 1999, she attended The New Seminary for Interfaith Studies, interested in spirituality. In 2002, she was ordained as Minister of Divinity at the Cathedral of St. John the Divine, and chose the title of Rainbow Reverend.

Cancer diagnosis and death 
Kleckner was diagnosed with cancer in 2004, and began to volunteer with SHARE Cancer Support as a result. For the last two years of her life, she used portable oxygen. She continued to teach, make drawings, and take photographs. She acted as an advisor at the One Spirit Interfaith Learning Alliance and worked with the Ovarian Cancer National Alliance. She died from the cancer in July 2010.

Her work was donated to the W. E. B. Du Bois Library in January 2012. In 2014, her work formed the visual core of the exhibition Documents from Greenham Common Women's Peace Camp, which paid tribute to the women who camped at Greenham Common.

References

External links 
 Susan Kleckner archive at UMass Amherst Libraries

Feminist filmmakers
Feminist artists
American feminists
American feminist writers
Anti-nuclear activists